Fukuchiyama-ike Dam is an earthfill dam located in Fukuoka Prefecture in Japan. The dam is used for irrigation. The catchment area of the dam is 5.9 km2. The dam impounds about 6  ha of land when full and can store 416 thousand cubic meters of water. The construction of the dam was completed in 1953.

References

Dams in Fukuoka Prefecture
1953 establishments in Japan